6-Chloronicotine is a drug which acts as an agonist at neural nicotinic acetylcholine receptors. It substitutes for nicotine in animal studies with around twice the potency, and shows antinociceptive effects.

See also
 ABT-418
 Altinicline
 Epibatidine
 Tebanicline

References 

Nicotinic agonists
Chloropyridines
Pyrrolidines